Eresiomera rutilo is a butterfly in the family Lycaenidae. It is found in Cameroon, Gabon, the Republic of the Congo and western Uganda.

References

Butterflies described in 1910
Poritiinae